Doris Leuthard (born 10 April 1963) is a Swiss politician and lawyer who served as a Member of the Swiss Federal Council from 2006 to 2018. A member of the Christian Democratic People's Party (CVP/PDC), she was elected as President of the Swiss Confederation for 2010 and 2017. Leuthard headed the Federal Department of Economic Affairs until 2010, when she became head of the Federal Department of Environment, Transport, Energy and Communications. As of 19 December 2019 she is a member of the board of the Kofi Annan Foundation.

Biography 
Leuthard was a member of the Swiss National Council from 1999 to 2006 for the canton of Aargau. She presided over the Christian Democratic People's Party from 2004 to 2006. Following the resignation of Joseph Deiss from the Swiss Federal Council, Leuthard was elected as his successor on 14 June 2006. She received 133 out of 234 valid votes to become the 109th Federal Councillor. She is the fifth woman elected to the Federal Council. Her election represented a departure from a long precedent of replacing a Member of the Federal Council with someone from the same language group. While Deiss was a French speaker, Leuthard is a German speaker.

From 1 August 2006 until 31 October 2010, she was head of the Federal Department of Economic Affairs. On 1 November 2010 she became head of the Federal Department of Environment, Transport, Energy and Communications, succeeding Moritz Leuenberger. For the calendar year 2009, Leuthard was elected Vice President of the Swiss Confederation, virtually assuring her election as President of the Confederation for the calendar year 2010. Due to a large amount of turnover on the Federal Council in recent years, she was the longest-serving Federal Councillor not to have served as the body's president.

She was elected President of the Confederation for 2010 and 2017. She became the third woman to hold the post, after Ruth Dreifuss (1999) and Micheline Calmy-Rey (2007). As President of the Confederation, Leuthard presided over meetings of the Federal Council and carried out representative functions that would normally be handled by a head of state in other democracies (though in Switzerland, the Federal Council as a whole is regarded as the head of state). She was also the highest-ranking official in the Swiss order of precedence and had the power to act on behalf of the whole Federal Council in emergency situations. However, in most cases, Leuthard was merely primus inter pares, with no power above and beyond her six colleagues.

She was succeeded by Calmy-Rey in 2011, the first time two women held the office in succession. Following a reshuffle of portfolios after the by-election of two new Federal Councillors in 2010, Leuthard replaced outgoing Moritz Leuenberger at the head of the Federal Department of Environment, Transport, Energy and Communications. In her capacity as minister, she was appointed by United Nations Secretary General António Guterres in 2018 to the High-level Panel on Digital Cooperation, co-chaired by Melinda Gates and Jack Ma.

The project SAFFA 2020 is under the patronage of the three Federal Councillors: Leuthard, Simonetta Sommaruga and Eveline Widmer-Schlumpf, as well as by the former Federal Councillor Calmy-Rey.

In July 2022, Swiss media reported that Doris Leuthard was the victim of agression by her husband in their vacation home in Ticino. Her husband has been detained in a psychiatric prison by the Swiss police because of the chance of recidivism.

See also
 2006 Swiss Federal Council election

References

External links

Address by Doris Leuthard (as President of Switzerland) at the General Debate of the 65th Session of the General Assembly of the United Nations, 23 September 2010: video (in French); written translation of the statement into English

|-

|-

|-

|-

|-

|-

1963 births
20th-century Swiss politicians
20th-century Swiss women politicians
21st-century Swiss politicians
21st-century Swiss women politicians
Aargau politicians
Agriculture ministers of Switzerland
Christian Democratic People's Party of Switzerland politicians
Female heads of state
Living people
Members of the National Council (Switzerland)
Members of the Federal Council (Switzerland)
People from Muri District
Swiss Roman Catholics
University of Zurich alumni
Women members of the National Council (Switzerland)
Women members of the Federal Council (Switzerland)